The Journal of the Canadian Dental Association (JCDA) is a bimonthly peer-reviewed dental journal published by the Canadian Dental Association.  It is more commonly referred to by its web address JCDA.ca, owing to its evolution into a print and electronic based knowledge network.

History
Published dental literature in Canada was first produced by Dr. W.H. Elliot of Montreal, PQ who published 18 papers in the American Dental Journal starting in 1842. In the 1850s there were several attempts to create a Canadian dental journal (the Family Dentist from Brockville and Journal of the Times from Halifax) but none lasted very long.

In 1868, Dr. W. George Beers of Montreal ("the father of lacrosse") published the Canadian Journal of Dental Science.  Dr. Beers later moved to Hamilton, Ontario where he recruited Dr. Curtis Chittenden (a founder of the Ontario Dental Association) as an associate editor.  The journal struggled and eventually failed in 1879.

Dr. Beers, returned to Montreal where, in 1889, he launched the Dominion Dental Journal 10 years after the failure of his previous journal.  The Dominion Dental Journal became Canada's preeminent dental journal and persisted for more than 46 years.  In 1935, it was absorbed by the newly created Journal of the Canadian Dental Association and joined with La Revue dentaire canadienne, a French language dental journal that had been founded in 1915 under the editorship of Honoré Thibault.
JCDA has been published since that time in both English and French.

The modern journal
The modern JCDA has transformed into a network of knowledge delivery vehicles.  The printed journal still exists but it is one piece of a system that includes the JCDA.ca website, the JCDA Clinical Q&A blogs, the JCDA Oasis mobile platform and social media bulletins through email (JCDA Express and JCDA Bulletin), Twitter (JCDATweets & JCDAClinicalQA), Facebook and LinkedIn.

Impact
In the 2012 Journal Citation Reports, JCDA had an impact factor of 0.624.  JCDA is indexed in Medline, Journal Citation Reports and Science Citation Index.

Publication Model
JCDA has a continuous publication model, where articles are published to JCDA.ca before, or in place, of being published in the printed journal.  The printed journal is distributed to all dentists and dental students in Canada as well some colleagues outside of Canada.

Major Delivery Networks

Core Sections of JCDA (print & web)
JCDA has three core sections of material.

Research; A scholarly section of publications that has been peer-reviewed by at least 2 external examiners and consists of information that is novel to the dental literature.

Clinical Dentistry; A clinically focused section in user friendly formats such as case reports, "point-of-care" and diagnostic challenges.  Some of the material will be peer-reviewed while others will be informative/opinion pieces.

News & Issues; A section dedicated to the news and issues from the Canadian Dental Association and/or the provincial dental societies.

JCDA Oasis
JCDA Oasis was launched in 2011 to create an area for collaboratively edited content, in the Web 2.0 spirit, where rapid publication, dissemination and open dialogue between contributors and readers are pillars of process.  JCDA involves organizations (e.g. Organization for Safety, Asepsis and Prevention), industry partners and dentists (e.g. Coronation Dental Specialty Group) to create content then it is opened to discussion with readers.  There are three core sections.

Oasis Discussions; Launched in 2012, Oasis Discussions (previously named Clinical Q&A) is an open forum for discussion of clinical cases, in a blog format with multi-media presentations.  Oasis Discussions is hosted at OasisDiscussions.ca.  Each week, volunteer specialists from across Canada & the US post open ended questions and research on case management and "hot" topics, the goal of which is to foster lively discussions between professionals.

Oasis Mobile; A resource created through a collaborative effort of dentists and other professionals from across Canada to offer an "Online Advice and Searchable Information System"; OASIS.  The site offers concise clinical information and decision supports for everyday practice.  The broad categories of information are medical conditions, prescription drugs and dental & medical emergencies

Case Conferences; Webinar discussions of specific clinical cases.

Other Sections
JCDA also features classified ads for dentists in Canada as well as a products and services section where industry can display their products.

Open Access Policy
JCDA is an open access Journal with a continuous publication model.

References 

Bimonthly journals
Dentistry journals
Open access journals
English-language journals